Adrian Thomas may refer to:

 Adrian Thomas (composer), composer and professor of music at Cardiff University School of Music
 Adrian P. Thomas, American victim of miscarriage of justice
 Adrian Thomas (zoologist) (born 1963), British professor of zoology at Oxford University